DYNU-TV, channel 39, is a UHF television station owned by the Information Broadcast Unlimited through its licensee, Progressive Broadcasting Corporation, and operated by Breakthrough and Milestones Productions International Inc. (BMPI) in the Philippines, respectively. The station's studio is located at UNTV Satellite Office, G.K. Chua Bldg., MJ Cuenco Ave., Cebu City and transmitter is located at Busay, Cebu City with the power of 10,000 watts, the same as 107.5 Win Radio Cebu.

Members Church of God International
Television stations in Cebu City
Television channels and stations established in 2001